The 2017 Sioux City Bandits season is the team's seventeenth as the Sioux City Bandits, eighteenth overall and third as a member of Champions Indoor Football (CIF). One of 14 teams in the CIF for the 2017 season, they play in the 7-team North Conference.

The Bandits play their home games at the Tyson Events Center in Sioux City, Iowa, under the direction of head coach Erv Strohbeen. The team's offensive coordinator is Jarrod DeGeorgia, the defensive coordinator is John Zevenbergen, and the assistant coaches include Dave Croston and Paul Dacres.

Awards and honors
Each week of the regular season, the CIF names league-wide Players of the Week in offensive, defensive, and special teams categories.
 For Week 1, the CIF named defensive lineman Devon Bridges as the Defensive Player of the Week, and kick returner Dominique Carson as the Special Teams Player of the Week.
 For Week 2, the CIF named running back Frederick Bruno as the Offensive Player of the Week, scoring five touchdowns and rushing for 93 yards on ten carries and also caught three passes for 31 yards.
 In Week 5, the CIF honored defensive back Cliff Stokes as the Defensive Player of the Week, as he recorded six tackles and intercepted three passes (scoring on one interception), to accompany his 71 interception-return yards.
 For Week 6, the CIF brought kicker Greg Conry into the spotlight as the Special Teams Player of the Week, as he scored 21 of the team's 63 points, pushing the Bandits past Omaha, 63–56. Conry was 6/6 on extra point attempts, and went 5/6 on field goal kicking. He nailed kicks from 29, 32, 35, 40, and 49 yards. His only Miss came from 46 yards away.
 In Week 7, the CIF named defensive lineman Devon Bridges as the Defensive Player of the Week for his second time of the season. He made eight tackles, had three tackles-for-loss, including 1.5 sacks.
 During Week 13, Bandits kicker Greg Conry became the Special Team's Player of the Week for the second week, scoring 17 total points, as he was perfect for both field goals (3/3) and extra points (8/8).

Standings

Schedule 
Key:

Preseason

Regular season

Post-season

Roster

References

Sioux City Bandits
2017 in sports in Iowa
Sioux City Bandits